Major David George Ian Alexander Gordon, 4th Marquess of Aberdeen and Temair  (21 January 1908 – 13 September 1974) was a British peer, soldier, and the son of Dudley Gordon, 3rd Marquess of Aberdeen and Temair.

Life
Gordon attended Harrow School and graduated from Balliol College, Oxford, in 1930 with a Bachelor of Arts, then with a Masters in 1968. He attained the rank of Major in the service of the 5th/7th Battalion of the Gordon Highlanders and fought in the Second World War.

He became Deputy Lieutenant of Aberdeenshire in 1949, Vice-Lieutenant of Aberdeenshire in 1959, and Lord-Lieutenant of Aberdeenshire in 1973. He was also a County Councillor for Aberdeenshire in 1950 and justice of the peace for Aberdeenshire in 1955.

He was admitted to Royal Company of Archers in 1955 and invested as a Commander of the Order of the British Empire in 1963. He was invested as a Knight of the Order of St John in 1964 and was a director of Northern Area Clydesdale Bank in 1968.

Family
On 29 April 1939, he married Beatrice Mary June Boissier, the daughter of Arthur Boissier, Headmaster of Harrow School (1939–1942). They had four (adopted) children:

Lady Mary Katherine Gordon (b. 30 May 1946), married Simon Piers Welfare and had issue.
Lady Sarah Caroline Gordon (b. 25 March 1948), married Patrick John Raleigh Scott and had issue.
Lord Andrew David Gordon (b. 6 March 1950), married Lucy Mary Frances Milligan and had issue.
Lord James Drummond Gordon (b. 11 April 1953), married Marilyn Sim.

Until 2004, adopted children of peers had no right to any courtesy title. However, as a result of a Royal Warrant dated 30 April 2004, adopted children are now automatically entitled to such styles and courtesy titles as their siblings. Therefore, on that date, Gordon's children automatically become lords and ladies.

References

External links

1908 births
1974 deaths
4
Commanders of the Order of the British Empire
Knights of the Order of St John
People educated at Harrow School
Gordon Highlanders officers
Alumni of Balliol College, Oxford
Deputy Lieutenants of Aberdeenshire
Lord-Lieutenants of Aberdeenshire
British Army personnel of World War II
Members of the Royal Company of Archers